Frederick William Sykes FRCO (1862 – 30 October 1932) was an organist and composer based in England.

Life

He was born in 1862, the son of Matthew Skyes and Mary Crowther.

He studied organ under Dr. William Spark, the Leeds Borough Organist, and succeeded Edward Johnson Bellerby after a competition to elect his successor.

He married Margaret Richardson Wilson in 1884 and had two children:
Evelyn Hilda Sykes 1886 - 1969
Bertha Sykes 1889

Appointments

Organist of St. Peter's Church, Morley, ???? - 1881
Organist of Selby Abbey 1881 - 1919

Compositions

He composed music for organ and choir

References

1862 births
1932 deaths
English organists
British male organists
English composers
Fellows of the Royal College of Organists